Cambodia is participating at the 2011 Southeast Asian Games which are being held in the cities of Palembang and Jakarta, Indonesia from 11 November 2011 to 22 November 2011.

Competitors

Medals

Medal table

Medals by date

Medalists

References 

2011
Southeast Asian Games
Nations at the 2011 Southeast Asian Games